Left bundle branch block (LBBB) is a conduction abnormality in the heart that can be seen on an electrocardiogram (ECG). In this condition, activation of the left ventricle of the heart is delayed, which causes the left ventricle to contract later than the right ventricle.

Causes
Among the causes of LBBB are:
 Aortic stenosis
 Dilated cardiomyopathy
 Acute myocardial infarction
 Extensive coronary artery disease
 Primary disease of the cardiac electrical conduction system
 Long standing hypertension leading to aortic root dilatation and subsequent aortic regurgitation
 Lyme disease

Mechanisms 
Slow or absent conduction through the left bundle branch means that it takes longer than normal for the left ventricle to fully depolarise.  This can be due to a damaged bundle branch that is completely unable to conduct, but may represent intact conduction that is slower than normal.  LBBB may be fixed, present at all times, but may be intermittent for example occurring only during rapid heart rates.  This may be due to the bundle having a longer refractory period than usual.

Diagnosis

LBBB is diagnosed on a 12-lead ECG.  In adults, it is seen as wide QRS complexes lasting ≥120ms with characteristic QRS shapes in the precordial leads, although narrower complexes are seen in children.  In lead V1, the QRS complex is often entirely negative (QS morphology), although a small initial R wave may be seen (rS morphology).  In the lateral leads (I, aVL, V5-V6) the QRS complexes are usually predominantly positive with a slow upstroke last >60ms to the R-wave peak.  Notching may be seen in these leads but this is not universal. The small Q-waves that are usually seen in the lateral leads are absent in LBBB.  T-waves usually point in the opposite direction to the terminal portion of the preceding QRS - positive QRS complexes have negative T-waves while negative QRS complexes have positive T-waves.  The ST segments typically slur into the T-wave and often appear elevated in leads with negative QRS complexes. The axis may be normal but may be deviated to the left or right.

There are also partial blocks of the left bundle branch: "left anterior fascicular block" (LAFB) and a "left posterior fascicular block" (LPFB). This refers to the block after the bifurcation of the left bundle branch.

Diagnostic consequences
The presence of LBBB results in that electrocardiography (ECG) cannot be used to diagnose left ventricular hypertrophy or Q wave infarction, because LBBB in itself results in a widened QRS complex and changes in the ST segment consistent with ischemia or injury.

Treatment
 Patients with LBBB require complete cardiac evaluation, and those with LBBB and syncope or near-syncope may require a pacemaker.
 Some patients with LBBB, a markedly prolonged QRS (usually > 150 ms), and systolic heart failure may benefit from a biventricular pacemaker, which allows for better synchrony of heart contractions.

See also
 Bundle branch block
 Right bundle branch block
 Sgarbossa's criteria

References

External links 

Cardiogenetic disorders

fr:Bloc de branche